Gandellino is a comune (municipality) in the Province of Bergamo in the Italian region of Lombardy, located about  northeast of Milan and about  northeast of Bergamo. 

Gandellino borders the following municipalities: Carona, Gromo, Valbondione, Valgoglio.

References